Major General Khaled Fawzy (In Arabic: خالد فوزي; b. 1957) is a former Director of the Egyptian General Intelligence Directorate (EGID). He was the head of the national security agency since 2013.

Biography 
He was born in 1957, in 1978 he was graduated from Military Science Military Academy, joined the EGID in 1982, stayed in service till he reached the rank of Major General, and then pushed through to the post of head of the National Security in 2013, then became an assistant to the head of the Egyptian General Intelligence for National Security Affairs. In 2018, Major General Abbas Kamel, a former Chief of Staff to Egyptian President Abdel Fattah el-Sisi, replaced Fawzy as Director of the Egyptian General Intelligence Directorate.

References

External links
 

Directors of the General Intelligence Directorate (Egypt)
1957 births
Living people
Egyptian military officers